"Mr. Torture" is a song and single made by the German metal band Helloween. This single is similar to the "If I Could Fly" single with the addition of "Mr. Torture" as the first track. Like many others of the band's lyrics, this song is rather humorous and not to be taken seriously. It is about Mr. Torture giving women sexual pleasure by practising BDSM.

The song is listed on the appendix of Robert Dimery's book 1001 Songs You Must Hear Before You Die (and 10,001 You Must Download), being the only Helloween song in the relation, over better known songs such as "I Want Out" and "Eagle Fly Free".

Track listing

Personnel
 Andi Deris - vocals 
 Michael Weikath - guitar
 Roland Grapow - guitar
 Markus Grosskopf - bass  guitar
 Uli Kusch - drums
 John Ellenbrock - acoustic grand piano

References

2000 singles
Helloween songs
2000 songs
Victor Entertainment singles
Songs about BDSM